P15 may refer to:

 Aviatik P.15, a German reconnaissance biplane
 CDKN2B, a human protein
 Lippisch P.15, a German prototype aircraft
 MAB PA-15 pistol
 Nissan Kicks (P15), a SUV
 P-15 radar, a Soviet radar system
 P15 road (Ukraine)
 P-15 Termit, a Soviet missile
 Papyrus 15, a biblical manuscript
 Pseudomonas sRNA P15
 WarFairy P-15, a firearm stock

See also 
 15P (disambiguation)